The Chevrolet Beretta is a front-wheel-drive two-door coupé produced by Chevrolet from 1987 until 1996. The Beretta was designed in the same design studio as the Camaro and the Corvette, Chevrolet Exterior Studio 3, and was built at the Wilmington, Delaware, and Linden, New Jersey assembly plants with other GM L platform models, the Chevrolet Corsica which came shortly before the Beretta, and the Canada-only Pontiac Tempest four-door sedans. The Beretta was produced in base, CL, GT, GTU, Indy, GTZ and Z26 models. A convertible was the pace car for the 1990 Indianapolis 500, and GM initially announced a production convertible replica, but a coupe version was offered instead.

Models and changes
Base model Berettas were equipped with the same powertrain as the Chevrolet Cavalier, the 2.2 L OHV 4-cylinder engine and the 3-speed automatic transmission by default, or the 60-degree V6. A 5-speed manual was available only by special order if paired with the 2.2 L OHV, however very few special orders ever took place, and the 3-speed automatic was the default option.

The GT included a 125 hp 2.8-liter V6, which grew to a 3.1 L in 1990, and the Z51 suspension package with 15-inch styled steel wheels and Goodyear Eagle GT tires. Also included was a sport cloth interior and sport steering wheel. The GTU was available from 1988 until the 1990 model year. Beretta GTUs (with the FE7 suspension package) were shipped to Cars and Concepts where they were equipped with 16x7-inch aluminum alloy wheels, custom body kits, a rear spoiler, mirrors, custom trim, and decals. With the FE7 Chevrolet claimed the Beretta GTU would deliver 0.92 g on the skid pad, a claim that most magazines of the day failed to duplicate. GTUs were only available in black, red and white.

The GTZ, which replaced the GTU, took over as the high-performance version of the Beretta. It was produced from 1990 until 1993. It came standard with Oldsmobile's 2.3-L high output Quad 4 inline-four, which produced 180 hp (134 kW) and 160 lb·ft (217 N·m) of torque. Also standard was a Getrag 5-speed manual transmission and GM's FE7 performance suspension.

Motor Trends only complaint was the Quad 4's NVH (noise, vibration and harshness) and noted it was one of the most raucous engines of its time. Beginning in 1991, the 3.1 L V6 could be had as an option on the GTZ, but it was only available with a 3-speed automatic transmission that increased the 0-to-60 mph time to around 9.0 seconds. The 3.1 L V6 was standard on 1990–1992 GT models and optional for all base models and GTs in 1992. Starting in the 1994 model year, the 3.1 L V6 could only be ordered with an automatic transmission.

The 1991 model year saw major interior updates, including a new dashboard and center console and the addition of a driver's side airbag.

In 1994, the GT and GTZ were replaced by the Beretta Z26, which put it squarely between the Cavalier Z24 and Lumina Z34 in Chevrolet's lineup. The 3.1 L V6 was redesigned and became the 3100 V6 and gained 20 hp at 160. The new 3100 V6 was only available with a new 4-speed automatic transmission. The Quad 4 HO lost a total of 10 hp (7 kW) in 1994, its last year of production. The 2.3 L Quad 4 was only available with a 5-speed manual transmission.

Beretta sales steadily declined every year of production as the market turned away from 2-door models. In 1996, Chevrolet ended production of both the Beretta and Corsica after 10 model years. The Corsica was replaced  by the Chevrolet Malibu in 1997. The last Beretta rolled off the assembly line on July 30, 1996.Production Figures:'

Models
 1987–1996 base/CL
 1988–1993 GT
 1988–1989 GTU
 1990 Indy
 1990–1993 GTZ had a 0–60 mph time of 7.6 seconds
 1994–1996 Z26 had a 0–60 mph time of 8.3 seconds

Gallery

Trademark issue
General Motors was sued by Fabbrica d'Armi Pietro Beretta for trademark infringement involving their use of the Beretta name for a car. The suit was settled out of court in 1989; GM and Beretta exchanged symbolic gifts: a Beretta GTU coupe and a pair of Beretta shotguns. General Motors donated US$500,000  to a Beretta-sponsored charity which was also affiliated with the GM Cancer Research Foundation.

Motorsport

The Beretta, using a splayed valve 4.5 liter 90 degree V6 engine, won the Trans Am Series championship in 1990.

References

External links

Beretta Net
Beretta Speed
Chevrolet Beretta Club Europe

Beretta
Mid-size cars
Coupés
1990s cars
Front-wheel-drive sports cars
Cars introduced in 1987
Motor vehicles manufactured in the United States
Cars discontinued in 1996